Gymnopholus lichenifer is a species of beetle in the weevil family, Curculionidae. It is endemic to Papua New Guinea, where it is known only from the vicinity of Mount Kaindi at elevations above 1700 meters. It is known by the common name lichen weevil.

References

Entiminae
Beetles of Oceania
Insects of Papua New Guinea
Endemic fauna of Papua New Guinea
Beetles described in 1966
Taxonomy articles created by Polbot